North Carolina's 8th Senate district is one of 50 districts in the North Carolina Senate. It has been represented by Republican Bill Rabon since 2011.

Geography
Since 2023, the district has included all of Columbus and Brunswick counties, as well as a small sliver of New Hanover County. The district overlaps with the 17th, 19th, and 46th state house districts.

District officeholders since 1977

Election results

2022

2020

2018

2016

2014

2012

2010

2008

2006

2004

2002

2000

References

North Carolina Senate districts
Columbus County, North Carolina
Brunswick County, North Carolina
New Hanover County, North Carolina